Simon Casady (June 16, 1852 – March 25, 1928) was a prominent banker in Iowa, best known for helping organize the Des Moines Bank, which later became the Des Moines Savings Bank. Casady served as president of the Des Moines Savings Bank, vice president of the Iowa National Bank, and treasurer of the Bankers Life Association. Casady has been called "the dean of Iowa bankers" by news accounts. He was a member of the Casady family, an influential family of bankers, politicians, landowners, and farmers who played an important role in the early history and legislation of Iowa.

Life
Born in Des Moines in 1852, at 314 Fifth Street, in a house that later became the site of the Central State Bank. He was the son of state senator and judge Phineas M. Casady and his wife Wilhelmina Augusta Grimmel. Judge Casady was an early pioneer settler in Iowa, prominent in city and state politics. In 1880, Casady and his wife, Sarah Conarroe Griffiths, became the first native-born couple to be married in Des Moines. A court case between Simon Casady and his brother Frank Casady involving inheritance from their father Phineas, Casady v. Casady, 184 Iowa 1241 (1918), went before the Iowa Supreme Court, with the court ruling in favor of Simon Casady.

Simon Casady was a member of the Benevolent and Protective Order of Elks.

Simon's wife Sarah was active in the movement to oppose the extension of women's suffrage. In January of 1916, Sarah Casady founded and served as leader of the Iowa branch of the National Association Opposed to Woman Suffrage (NAOWS). The organization predominantly consisted of middle to upper class college-educated Christian housewives.

Legacy
The Simon Casady Residence, built in 1905, is still standing and is located on 715 Hickman Road in Des Moines. The original address for the Simon Casady Residence was 715 Prospect Road, Des Moines.

See also

Iowa-Des Moines National Bank Building

References

1852 births
1928 deaths
American bankers
American people of Scotch-Irish descent
Burials at Woodland Cemetery (Des Moines, Iowa)
Businesspeople from Des Moines, Iowa
Casady family